Grachyovka is a rural locality (a village) in Shaymuratovsky Selsoviet, Karmaskalinsky District, Bashkortostan, Russia. The population was 70 as of 2010. There are 2 streets.

Geography 
Grachyovka is located 29 km northwest of Karmaskaly (the district's administrative centre) by road. Novoandreyevka is the nearest rural locality.

References 

Rural localities in Karmaskalinsky District